Monk Dawson is a film that was released in 1998, directed and produced by Tom Waller and starring John Michie, Benedict Taylor, Martin Kemp, Rhona Mitra, and Paula Hamilton. It was based on the 1969 novel of the same name written by Piers Paul Read.

The film is about Eddie Dawson, a monk who has led a sheltered existence at a Benedictine monastery, but when he is expelled from his order he has to learn to deal with the harsh realities of everyday life in 1970s London, finding work as a journalist. He falls in love with a beautiful widow then discovers she has been having an affair with his best friend.

Eddie later marries a young girl who he first met whilst a priest in the parish,  however he decides to return to live as a monk on a remote island.

Despite being well received by film critics, the lack of a well-known cast led to a short box office run in the United Kingdom with a gross of just £7,210, and a straight to video release for the United States market. The film was chosen as the closer for the Leeds International Film Festival, and in 1999 it was also nominated for Best Film at the UK Creative Freedom Awards.

In Canada and the United States the film was re-released in 2004 as Passion of the Priest.

References

External links 

De Warrenne Pictures: Monk Dawson
FilmThreat.com: Monk Dawson

1998 films
1998 drama films
British drama films
Films based on British novels
Films set in London
Films set in the 1970s
1990s English-language films
1990s British films